John M. Rusche (born December 3, 1950 in Waukesha, Wisconsin) was a  Democratic Idaho State Representative representing District 6 in the B seat from 2012 to 2016. Rusche served in the District 6 B seat from 2004 to 2012.  Rusche served as the minority leader from 2008 to 2016.

Education
Rusche graduated from Aquinas High School, La Crosse, Wisconsin, in 1969. He earned his Bachelor of Science in chemical engineering from the University of Notre Dame, and Doctor of Medicine from Washington University School of Medicine in St. Louis, Missouri.

Elections
District 7B

2016

Rusche was unopposed for the May 17, 2016 Democratic Primary. Rusche lost to Mike Kingsley by 3,130 votes.

Rusche supported Hillary Clinton for the Democratic Party presidential primaries, 2016.

2014

Rusche was unopposed for the May 20, 2014 Democratic Primary. Rusche won against Mike Kingsley by 48 votes.

2012

Rusche was redistricted to District 6, and with Democratic Representative Shirley Ringo redistricted to District 5, Rusche was unopposed for the May 15, 2012 Democratic Primary, and won with 984 votes, and won the November 6, 2012 General election with 9,531 votes (52.3%) against Republican nominee Daniel Santiago.

District 6B

2010

Rusche was unopposed for the May 25, 2010 Democratic Primary, and won with 1,552 votes, and was unopposed for the November 2, 2010 General Election, winning with 9,499 votes.

2008

Rusche was unopposed for the May 27, 2008 Democratic Primary, and won with 1,516 votes, and won the November 4, 2008 General Election, winning with 13,608 votes against a write-in candidate, who received none.

2006

Rusche was unopposed for the May 23, 2006 Democratic Primary, and won with 1,256 votes, and was unopposed for the November 7, 2006 General Election, winning with 9,824 votes.

2004

When Democratic Representative Mike Naccarato ran for the District 7 senate seat leaving the B seat open, Rusche was unopposed for the May 25, 2004 Democratic Primary, and won with 1,998 votes, and won the November 2, 2004 General Election with 8,850 votes (50.9%) against Republican nominee Charlie Pottenger.

References

External links
John Rusche at the Idaho Legislature
Campaign site

1950 births
Living people
Democratic Party members of the Idaho House of Representatives
People from Lewiston, Idaho
Politicians from La Crosse, Wisconsin
Politicians from Waukesha, Wisconsin
Physicians from Idaho
Aquinas High School (La Crosse, Wisconsin) alumni
University of Notre Dame alumni
Washington University School of Medicine alumni
21st-century American politicians